Pentachaeta exilis is a species of flowering plant in the family Asteraceae known by the common name meager pygmydaisy. It is endemic to California, where it is known from the North Coast Ranges to the southern Central Valley, San Joaquin Valley, and Sierra Nevada foothills. It is a member of grassland and woodland plant communities.

Description 
Pentachaeta exilis is an annual herb with a hairy stem no more than about 6 centimeters tall. The narrow linear leaves are up to 3 centimeters long but only about a millimeter wide. The inflorescence is a solitary flower head, with up to 23 heads per plant. The two subspecies of the plant have different types of heads. Most incidences of the plant are ssp. exilis, which has long reddish disc florets in its head but only rudimentary ray florets. The rare subspecies aeolica, which is known from just a few occurrences in the Central Coast Ranges, generally produces some white ray florets around a center of yellow disc florets.

External links
 Calflora Database: Pentachaeta exilis (Meager pygmydaisy,  Slender pentachaeta)
Jepson Manual eFlora treatment of Pentachaeta exilis
USDA Plants Profile for Pentachaeta exilis
UC CalPhotos gallery of Pentachaeta exilis ssp. aeolica
UC CalPhotos gallery of  Pentachaeta exilis ssp. exilis

Astereae
Endemic flora of California
Flora of the Sierra Nevada (United States)
Natural history of the California chaparral and woodlands
Natural history of the California Coast Ranges
Natural history of the Central Valley (California)
Taxa named by Asa Gray
Flora without expected TNC conservation status